Otway Henderson House is a historic home located at McCormick in McCormick County, South Carolina.  It was built around 1889 and is a -story home. Its frame is Second Empire style. It features a dual-pitched mansard roof and a one-story porch with rectangular posts and railing. It was built by Otway Henderson, a prominent cotton farmer of the county.

It was listed on the National Register of Historic Places in 1985.

References

Houses on the National Register of Historic Places in South Carolina
Second Empire architecture in South Carolina
Houses completed in 1889
Houses in McCormick County, South Carolina
National Register of Historic Places in McCormick County, South Carolina